Nguyễn Tuấn Phong (born 14 October 1981) is a Vietnamese footballer who plays as a midfielder for V-League club Đồng Tâm Long An. He was a member of Vietnam national football team.

References 

1981 births
Living people
Vietnamese footballers
Association football midfielders
V.League 1 players
Vietnam international footballers